An arylene or arenediyl is a substituent of an organic compound that is derived from an aromatic hydrocarbon (arene) and is bivalent, such as phenylene.

See also

Aromatic hydrocarbon
Aromaticity

References

Aromatic hydrocarbons